Vitarroz, founded in 1955, is the second largest supplier and distributor of Hispanic food products in the Northeastern United States. The company is based in Kearny, New Jersey.

The company's product line comprises over 300 branded products, including rice, beans, beverages, and other products.

In August 2009, the Vitarroz brand was purchased by Dominican-American calling card magnate Carlos Gomez.

References

External links 
Vitarroz official site

Companies based in Hudson County, New Jersey
Economy of the Northeastern United States
Catering and food service companies of the United States
Food and drink companies established in 1955
1955 establishments in New Jersey